Valoria H. Loveland is an American farmer and politician who served as the director of the Washington State Department of Agriculture from 2002 to 2008. A member of the Democratic Party, she previously served as a member of the Washington State Senate, representing the 16th district from 1993 to 2001.

References

Living people
State cabinet secretaries of Washington (state)
Democratic Party Washington (state) state senators
Women state legislators in Washington (state)
Year of birth missing (living people)